Ömer Faruk Gürler (1913 – 23 August 1975) was a Turkish general. He was the Commander of the Turkish Army during the 1971 Turkish coup d'état, and then Chief of the General Staff of Turkey (1972 - 1973). He was the military's candidate in the 1973 Presidential election, but lost to Fahri Korutürk (chosen by the Grand National Assembly of Turkey).

References 

1913 births
1975 deaths
Turkish Army generals
Commanders of the Turkish Land Forces
Chiefs of the Turkish General Staff
Commanders of the Second Army of Turkey